David Michael Gordon "Davey" Graham (originally spelled Davy Graham) (26 November 1940 – 15 December 2008) was a British guitarist and one of the most influential figures in the 1960s British folk revival. He inspired many famous practitioners of the fingerstyle acoustic guitar such as Bert Jansch, Wizz Jones, John Renbourn, Martin Carthy, John Martyn, Paul Simon and Jimmy Page,  who based his solo "White Summer" on Graham's "She Moved Through the Fair".  Graham is probably best known for his acoustic instrumental "Anji" and for popularizing DADGAD tuning, later widely adopted by acoustic guitarists.

Biography

Early life
Graham was born in Market Bosworth, Leicestershire, England, to a Guyanese mother, Winifred (known as Amanda) and a Scottish father, Hamish, a teacher from the Isle of Skye. He grew up in Westbourne Grove, in the Notting Hill Gate area of London. Although he never had any music theory lessons, he learnt to play the piano and harmonica as a child and then took up the classical guitar at the age of 12. As a teenager he was strongly influenced by the folk guitar player Steve Benbow, who had travelled widely with the army and played a guitar style influenced by Moroccan music.

"Anji"/"Angi"
At the age of 19, Graham wrote what is probably his most famous composition, the acoustic guitar solo "Angi" (sometimes spelled "Anji": see below). Colin Harper credits Graham with single-handedly inventing the concept of the folk guitar instrumental. "Angi", named after his then girlfriend, appeared on his debut EP 3/4 AD in April 1962. The tune spread through a generation of aspiring guitarists, changing its spelling as it went. Before the record was released, Bert Jansch had learnt it from a 1961 tape borrowed from Len Partridge. Jansch included it on his 1965 debut album as "Angie". The spelling Anji became the more widely used after it appeared on Simon & Garfunkel's 1966 album Sounds of Silence. In 1969, the same name for Chicken Shack's 100 Ton Chicken was used.

"Anji" soon became a rite of passage for many acoustic finger-style guitarists. Arlen Roth has recorded "Anji" on two separate albums of his.

Some other musicians of note who have covered "Anji" are John Renbourn, Lillebjørn Nilsen, Gordon Giltrap, Clive Carroll and the anarchist group Chumbawamba, who used the guitar piece as a basis for their anti-war song "Jacob's Ladder (Not in My Name)".

"Angi" is the second track on the first CD of the Topic Records 70-year anniversary boxed set Three Score and Ten.

Folk fame
Graham came to the attention of guitarists through his appearance in a 1959 broadcast of the BBC TV arts series Monitor, produced by Ken Russell and titled Hound Dogs and Bach Addicts: The Guitar Craze, in which he played an acoustic instrumental version of "Cry Me a River". During the 1960s, Graham released a string of albums of music from all around the world in many genres. 1964's Folk, Blues and Beyond and the following year's collaboration with the folk singer Shirley Collins, Folk Roots, New Routes, are frequently cited among his most influential album releases. Large as Life and Twice as Natural includes his cover of Joni Mitchell's "Both Sides, Now" alongside unprecedented explorations of Eastern Modes and scales played in Faustian takes on a Gibson J45 steel string guitar.

His continuous touring of the world as a beat mystic traveller, picking up and then recording different styles of music for the guitar, has resulted in many musicians crediting him with founding world music. However, though Graham recorded in a variety of genres and loved to play the oud, he was no purist, absorbing all his influences into his own ever-expanding conception of the possibilities of guitar music. Quizzed, for instance, on his introduction of a chord progression into an Arabic maqam, his amiable retort was to the effect that, if he felt like it and it sounded alright, why shouldn't he?

Graham appears (uncredited) playing guitar in a pub in Joseph Losey's 1963 film The Servant.

Retirement
Graham married the American singer Holly Gwinn in the late 1960s and recorded the albums The Holly Kaleidosope and Godington Boundary with her in 1970, shortly before Gwinn had to return to the US and he was unable to follow her, because of his visa problem due to a marijuana conviction.
He later described himself as having been "a casualty of too much self-indulgence", becoming a heroin addict in imitation of his jazz heroes. During this period, he taught acoustic guitar and also undertook charity work, particularly for various mental health charities. For several years he was on the executive council of Mind and he was involved for some time with the mystic Osho (Bhagwan Shree Rajneesh).

In 1976 Graham recorded All That Moody, essentially a private pressing that remains his most collectible vinyl record owing to its "moody" nature and rarity. He recorded two further groundbreaking albums for Kicking Mule, 1978's The Complete Guitarist and 1980's Dance For Two People.

He continued to play concerts, but dedicated the main thrust of his life to studying languages; he was fluent in Gaelic (taught by his native-speaking father), French, and Greek and could hold his own in Turkish. 
He collected poems and folk songs and would regale his neighbours. After some time he became increasingly disinhibited. His penultimate album Playing in Traffic was so titled as he was frustrated by trying to learn Bach in the noise of 11 Lyme Street, Camden, where a boatyard used to operate on the canal just outside his bedroom.

Rediscovery and death
Graham was the subject of a 2005 BBC Radio documentary, Whatever Happened to Davy Graham? and in 2006 featured in the BBC Four documentary Folk Britannia.

Many people sought out Graham over the years and tried to encourage him to return to the stage to play live; the last of this long line of seekers was Mark Pavey, who arranged some outings with guitarists and old friends including Bert Jansch, Duck Baker and Martin Carthy. These concerts were typically eclectic, with Graham playing a mix of acoustic blues, Romanian dance tunes, Irish pipe tunes, songs from South Africa and pieces by Bach. His final album, Broken Biscuits, consisted of originals and new arrangements of traditional songs from around the world.

Graham was diagnosed with lung cancer in 2008 and died on 15 December of that year. He is survived by his two daughters, Mercy and Kim.

In November 2016, a blue plaque was installed at his birthplace, the former Bosworth Park Infirmary building.

Influence
Graham did not seek or achieve great commercial success, though his music received positive critical feedback and influenced folk revival artists and fellow players such as Bert Jansch, John Renbourn, Martin Carthy, Ralph McTell, Wizz Jones, John Martyn, Nick Drake, Ritchie Blackmore, and Paul Simon, as well as folk rock bands such as Fairport Convention and Pentangle.

Though Graham is commonly referred to as a folk musician, the diversity of his music shows strong influences from many genres. Elements of blues, jazz, and Middle Eastern music are evident throughout his work.

Martin Carthy described Graham as "...an extraordinary, dedicated player, the one everyone followed and watched – I couldn't believe anyone could play like that," while Bert Jansch claimed that he was "courageous and controversial – he never followed the rules." Ray Davies maintained that the guitarist was "the greatest blues player I ever saw, apart from Big Bill Broonzy".

According to George Chkiantz, "What impressed me with Davy Graham...was he played the guitar fretboard somehow as if it was a keyboard. There was a kind of freedom. You weren't conscious of him using chord shapes at all: his fingers just seemed to run around with complete freedom on the fretboard."

DADGAD
One of Graham's lasting legacies is the DADGAD (Open Dsus4) guitar tuning, which he popularised in the early 1960s. While travelling in Morocco, he developed the tuning so he could better play along with and translate the traditional oud music he heard to guitar.  Graham then went on to experiment playing traditional folk pieces in DADGAD tuning, often incorporating Indian and Middle Eastern scales and melodies.  A good example is his arrangement of the traditional air She Moved Through the Fair, which he recorded live at the Troubadour in Earl's Court in 1964. The tuning provides freedom to improvise in the treble, while maintaining a solid underlying harmony and rhythm in the bass—though it restricts the number of readily playable keys. While guitarists used "non-standard" or "non-classical" tunings before this (e.g., open E and open G in common use by blues and slide guitar players) DADGAD introduced a new "standard" tuning. Many guitarists now use the tuning, especially in folk and world music.

Discography

Studio albums

 The Guitar Player (1963)
 Folk, Blues and Beyond (1965)
 Midnight Man (1966)
 Large as Life and Twice as Natural (1968)
 Hat (1969)
 Holly Kaleidoscope (1970)
 Godington Boundary (1970) (with Holly Gwinn)
 All That Moody (1976)
 The Complete Guitarist (1978)
 Playing in Traffic (1991)
 Broken Biscuits (2007)

EPs
 3/4 AD (1962)
 From a London Hootenanny (1963)

Live albums
 After Hours (1997)

Compilations
 Dance for Two People (1979)
 Folk Blues and All Points in Between (1985)
 Fire in the Soul (1999)
 The Best of Davy Graham (A Scholar & A Gentleman) (2009)
 Anthology-Lost Tapes 1961–2007 (2012)

Collaborations
 Folk Roots, New Routes (1964) with Shirley Collins

Bibliography
 Harper, Colin (2005), Irish Folk, Trad and Blues: a Secret History
 Harper, Colin (2006), Dazzling Stranger: Bert Jansch and the British Folk and Blues Revival. Bloomsbury. 
 Hodgkinson, Will (2005). Article in The Guardian; Friday, 15 July 2005.
 The Times (2008). Obituary published in The Times, 22 December 2008, p. 50.
 Young, Rob (2010), "Electric Eden: Unearthing Britain's visionary music"

References

External links
 
 Article by John Renbourn and discography at the Folk Blues and Beyond site
 Interview given to www.terrascope.co.uk

1940 births
2008 deaths
English folk guitarists
English male guitarists
English blues guitarists
English jazz guitarists
English people of Guyanese descent
English people of Scottish descent
Deaths from lung cancer
Fingerstyle guitarists
People from Hinckley
Acoustic guitarists
Musicians from Leicestershire
Blues Incorporated members
20th-century British guitarists
20th-century British male musicians